OSME May Refer To.

Ornithological Society of the Middle East
Orissa School of Mining Engineering, Keonjhar